The brille (also called the ocular scale, eye cap or spectacle) is the layer of transparent, immovable disc-shaped skin or scale covering the eyes of some animals for protection, especially in animals without eyelids. The brille has evolved from a fusion of the upper and lower eyelids. Brille means "spectacles" or "glasses" in German, Norwegian, and Danish, as well as "shine" in French and Spanish.

In snakes, there are no eyelids and the brille is clear and cannot be distinguished, except when the animal is becoming ready for ecdysis. At that time, it becomes cloudy and is visible as a cover over the eye. When the snake moults, the brille is also shed, generally inside out, as part of its skin. The brilles protect their eyes from dust and dirt and give them a "glassy-eyed" blank appearance.

Snakes, flap-footed lizards, night lizards, and some skinks have brilles. All geckos except those in the subfamily Eublepharinae (eyelid geckos) possess brilles.

Some groups of bony fish have a transparent eyelid known as the adipose eyelid. Some reptiles, mammals and birds have a translucent third eyelid that moves horizontally across the eye called the nictitating membrane.

See also
 Ocular scales
 Snake scales

References

 Keeping and Breeding Geckos, Hermann Seufer, 1991.

Snake scales